Dari, also known as Dari Persian, is the variety of the Persian language spoken in Afghanistan. Dari is the term officially recognised and promoted since 1964 by the Afghan government for the Persian language, hence it is known as Afghan Persian or Eastern Persian in many Western sources. As Professor Nile Green remarks "the impulses behind renaming of Afghan Persian as Dari were more nationalistic than linguistic" in order to create an Afghan state narrative. Apart from a few basics of vocabulary, there is little difference between formal written Persian of Afghanistan and Iran. The term "Dari" is officially used for the characteristic spoken Persian of Afghanistan, but is best restricted to formal spoken registers. Persian-speakers in Afghanistan still prefer to call their language “Farsi,” while Pashto-speakers may sometimes refer to it as "Parsi." Farsi Dari serves as the lingua franca for interethnic communications in Afghanistan.

As defined in the Constitution of Afghanistan, it is one of the two official languages of Afghanistan; the other is Pashto. Dari is the most widely spoken language in Afghanistan and the native language of approximately 40–45% of the population. Dari serves as the lingua franca of the country and is understood by up to 78% of the population.

Dari served as the preferred literary and administrative language among non-native speakers, such as the Pashtuns and Mughals, for centuries before the rise of modern nationalism. Also, like Iranian Persian and Tajiki Persian, Dari Persian is a continuation of Middle Persian, the official religious and literary language of the Sassanian Empire (224–651 AD), itself a continuation of Old Persian, the language of the Achaemenids (550–330 BC). In historical usage, Dari refers to the Middle Persian court language of the Sassanids.

Etymology 
Dari is a name given to the New Persian language since the 10th century, widely used in Arabic (compare Al-Estakhri, Al-Muqaddasi and Ibn Hawqal) and Persian texts.

Since 1964, it has been the official name in Afghanistan for the Persian spoken there. In Afghanistan, Dari refers to a modern dialect form of Persian that is the standard language used in administration, government, radio, television, and print media. Because of a preponderance of Dari native speakers, who normally refer to the language as Farsi ("Persian"), it is also known as "Afghan Persian" in some Western sources.

There are different opinions about the origin of the word Dari. The majority of scholars believe that Dari refers to the Persian word dar or darbār, meaning "court", as it was the formal language of the Sassanids. The original meaning of the word dari is given in a notice attributed to Ibn al-Muqaffaʿ (cited by Ibn al-Nadim in Al-Fehrest). According to him, "Pārsī was the language spoken by priests, scholars, and the like; it is the language of Fars." This language refers to Middle Persian. As for Dari, he says, "it is the language of the cities of Madā'en; it is spoken by those who are at the king's court. [Its name] is connected with presence at court. Among the languages of the people of Khorasan and the east, the language of the people of Balkh is predominant."

The Dari language spoken in Afghanistan is not to be confused with the language of Iran called Dari or Gabri, which is a language of the Central Iranian subgroup spoken in some Zoroastrian communities.

History 
Dari comes from Middle Persian which was spoken during the rule of the Sassanid dynasty. In general, Iranian languages are known from three periods, usually referred to as Old, Middle, and New (Modern) periods. These correspond to three eras in Iranian history, the old era being the period from some time before, during, and after the Achaemenid period (that is, to 300 BC), the Middle Era being the next period, namely, the Sassanid period and part of the post-Sassanid period, and the New era being the period afterward down to the present day.

Dari or Deri has two meanings. It may mean the language of the court:
 "the Zebani Deri (Zeban i Deri or Zaban i Dari = the language of Deri), or the language of the court, and the Zebani Farsi, the dialect of Persia at large (...)"

It may also indicate a form of poetry used from Rudaki to Jami. In the fifteenth century it appeared in Herat under the Persian-speaking Timurid dynasty. The Persian-language poets of the Mughal Empire who used the Indian verse methods or rhyme methods, like Bedil and Muhammad Iqbal, became familiar with the araki form of poetry. Iqbal loved both styles of literature and poetry, when he wrote:

This can be translated as:

Even though in euphonious Hindi is sugar –
Rhyme method in Dari is sweeter

Hendī here refers more accurately to Urdu written in Perso-Arabic script. Uzūbat usually means "bliss", "delight", "sweetness"; in language, literature and poetry, uzubat also means "euphonious" or "melodic".

Referring to the 14th-century Persian poet Hafez, Iqbal wrote:

English translation:

Here qand-e Pārsī ("Rock candy of Persia") is a metaphor for the Persian language and poetry.

Persian replaced the Central Asian languages of the Eastern Iranics. Ferghana, Samarkand, and Bukhara were starting to be linguistically Darified in originally Khorezmian and Soghdian areas during Samanid rule. Dari Persian spread around the Oxus River region, Afghanistan, and Khorasan after the Arab conquests and during Islamic-Arab rule. The replacement of the Pahlavi script with the Arabic script in order to write the Persian language was done by the Tahirids in 9th century Khorasan. The Dari Persian language spread and led to the extinction of Eastern Iranian languages like Bactrian, Khwarezmian with only a tiny amount of Sogdian descended Yaghnobi speakers remaining among the now Persian-speaking Tajik population of Central Asia, due to the fact that the Arab-Islamic army which invaded Central Asia also included some Persians who governed the region like the Sassanids. Persian was rooted into Central Asia by the Samanids. Persian phased out Sogdian. The role of lingua franca that Sogdian originally played was succeeded by Persian after the arrival of Islam.

Geographical distribution 

Dari is one of the two official languages of Afghanistan (the other being Pashto). In practice though, it serves as the de facto lingua franca among the various ethnolinguistic groups.

Dari is spoken natively by approximately twenty-five percent to eighty percent of the population of Afghanistan as a primary language. Tajiks, who comprise approximately 27% of the population, are the primary speakers, followed by Hazaras (9%) and Aymāqs (4%). Moreover, many Pashtuns living in Tajik and Hazara concentrated areas also use Dari as a first language. The World Factbook states that eighty percent of the Afghan population speaks the Dari language. About 2.5 million Afghans in Iran and Afghans in Pakistan, part of the wider Afghan diaspora, also speak Dari as one of their primary languages.

Dari dominates the northern, western, and central areas of Afghanistan, and is the common language spoken in cities such as Mazar-i-Sharif, Herat, Fayzabad, Panjshir, Bamiyan, and the Afghan capital of Kabul where all ethnic groups are settled. Dari-speaking communities also exist in southwestern and eastern Pashtun-dominated areas such as in the cities of Ghazni, Farah, Zaranj, Lashkar Gah, Kandahar, and Gardez.

Cultural influence 
Dari has contributed to the majority of Persian borrowings in several Indo-Aryan languages, such as Urdu, Hindi, Punjabi, Bengali and others, as it was the administrative, official, cultural language of the Persianate Mughal Empire and served as the lingua franca throughout the Indian subcontinent for centuries. Often based in Afghanistan, Turkic Central Asian conquerors brought the language into South Asia. The basis in general for the introduction of Persian language into the subcontinent was set, from its earliest days, by various Persianized Central Asian Turkic and Afghan dynasties. The sizable Persian component of the Anglo-Indian loan words in English and in Urdu therefore reflects the Dari pronunciation. For instance, the words dopiaza and pyjama come from the Dari pronunciation; in Iranian Persian they are pronounced do-piyāzeh and pey-jāmeh. Persian lexemes and certain morphological elements (e.g., the ezāfe) have often been employed to coin words for political and cultural concepts, items, or ideas that were historically unknown outside the South Asian region, as is the case with the aforementioned "borrowings". The Dari language has a rich and colorful tradition of proverbs that deeply reflect Afghan culture and relationships, as demonstrated by U.S. Navy Captain Edward Zellem in his bilingual books on Afghan Dari proverbs collected in Afghanistan.

Differences between Iranian and Afghan Persian 
There are phonological, lexical, and morphological differences between Afghan Persian and Iranian Persian. There are no significant differences in the written forms, other than regional idiomatic phrases.

Phonological differences 
The phonology of Dari as spoken in Kabul, compared to Classical Persian, is overall more conservative than the standard accent of Iran. The principal differences between standard Iranian Persian and Afghan Persian as based on the Kabul dialect are:

 The merging of majhul vowels  and  into  and  respectively in Iranian Persian, whereas in Afghan Persian, they are still kept separate.
 The treatment of the diphthongs of early Classical Persian "ay" (as "i" in English "size") and "aw" (as "ow" in Engl. "low") in Iranian Persian. This does not occur in Afghan Persian.
 The convergence of the voiced uvular stop  (ق) and the voiced velar fricative  (غ) in Iranian Persian (presumably under the influence of Turkic languages like Azeri and Turkmen) is absent in Dari, where the two are still kept separate.

Dialect continuum 
The dialects of Dari spoken in Northern, Central, and Eastern Afghanistan, for example in Kabul, Mazar, and Badakhshan, have distinct features compared to Iranian Persian. However, the dialect of Dari spoken in Western Afghanistan stands in between the Afghan and Iranian Persian. For instance, the Herati dialect shares vocabulary and phonology with both Dari and Iranian Persian. Likewise, the dialect of Persian in Eastern Iran, for instance in Mashhad, is quite similar to the Herati dialect of Afghanistan.

The Kabuli dialect has become the standard model of Dari in Afghanistan, as has the Tehrani dialect in relation to the Persian in Iran. Since the 1940s, Radio Afghanistan has broadcast its Dari programs in Kabuli Dari, which ensured the homogenization between the Kabuli version of the language and other dialects of Dari spoken throughout Afghanistan. Since 2003, the media, especially the private radio and television broadcasters, have carried out their Dari programs using the Kabuli variety.

Phonology

Consonants 

 Stops // are phonetically dental [].
 A glottal stop /ʔ/ only appears in words of Arabic origin.
 A flap sound // may be realized as a trill sound [], in some environments, mostly word-final position; otherwise, they contrast between vowels wherein a trill occurs as a result of gemination (doubling) of [], especially in loanwords of Arabic origin. Only [] occurs before and after consonants; in word-final position, it is usually a free variation between a flap or a trill when followed by a consonant or a pause, but flap is more common, only flap before vowel-initial words.
 As in many other languages,  is realized as bilabial  before bilabial stops and as velar  before velar stops.
  is voiced to  before voiced consonants.

Vowels 

Political views and disputes on the language 

Successive governments of Afghanistan have promoted New Persian as an official language of government since the time of the Delhi Sultanate (1206–1526), even as those governments were dominated by Pashtun people. Sher Ali Khan of the Barakzai dynasty (1826–1973) first introduced the Pashto language as an additional language of administration. The local name for the Persian variety spoken in Afghanistan was officially changed from Farsi to Dari, meaning "court language", in 1964. Zaher said there would be, as there are now, two official languages, Pashto and Farsi, though the latter would henceforth be named Dari. Within their respective linguistic boundaries, Dari and Pashto are the media of education.

The term continues to divide opinion in Afghanistan today. While Dari has been the official name for decades, "Farsi" is still the preferred name to many Persian speakers of Afghanistan. Omar Samad, an Afghan analyst and ambassador, says of the dispute:

See also 

 Persian grammar
 Middle Persian
 Tajik language
 Hazaragi dialect

References

Further reading 

 Lazard, G. "Darī – The New Persian Literary Language " in Encyclopædia Iranica Online Edition.
 
 Sakaria, S. (1967) Concise English – Afghan Dari Dictionary, Ferozsons, Kabul, OCLC 600815
 Farhadi, A. G. R.('Abd-ul-Ghafur Farhadi)(Abd-ul-ghafûr Farhâdi) (1955) Le Persan Parlé en Afghanistan: Grammaire du Kâboli Accompagné d'un Recueil de Quatrains Populaires de la Région de Kâbol, Centre national de la recherche scientifique or Librairie C. Klincksieck, Paris.
 Farhadi, Rawan A. G. (1975) The Spoken Dari of Afghanistan: A Grammar of Kaboli Dari (Persian) Compared to the Literary Language, Peace Corps, Kabul, OCLC 24699677
 Zellem, Edward. 2015. 
 Zellem, Edward. 2012. 
 

 Harold F. Schiffman Language Policy and Language Conflict in Afghanistan and Its Neighbors (Brill's Studies in South and Southwest Asian Languages) BRILL, Leiden, 1.ed, 2011

External links 
 
 
 Dari at Encyclopædia Iranica
Dari language at Britannica
 Dari language, alphabet and pronunciation
 Dari language resources
 Dari alphabet 
 Dari encyclopedia on Miraheze

Eastern Persian dialects in Afghanistan
Languages of Iran
Languages of Afghanistan
Persian language in Pakistan